Eagle Way (also known locally as the Dr. Martin Luther King, Jr. Boulevard or the Hopkinsville Bypass) is a major partial beltway that circles almost completely around the outer portions of the city of Hopkinsville, Kentucky.

Route description
The roadway includes the entire length of the US 68 Bypass and the first  of Kentucky Route 1682. The road is located entirely in Christian County in western Kentucky.

History 
The bypass originally only consisted of a  extension of KY 1682 when it was first built at some time between 1973 and 1976. That road began life as a connector from KY 107 to US 41 on the north side of Hopkinsville.

Construction of the initial bypass went under construction and was completed by 1999. The 1999 project also included re-routing the KY 1682 western terminus. The first "new" section went from US 68 on the west side of Hopkinsville to a junction with U.S. Route 41 Alternate on the south side. By 2000-2001, an extension from US 41 Alternate to another junction with US 68 on the east side of town was constructed and completed.

in 2011, Eagle Way began providing access to the then-recently extended Pennyrile Parkway, now Interstate 169, which was really completed in 2012 when it was extended all the way to the Interstate 24 corridor in southern Christian County.

Future plans call for one final extension of the Hopkinsville Bypass that will go through the northeastern side of Hopkinsville going from the KY 107/KY 1682 junction to the eastern junction of US 68 (Jefferson Davis Highway)/US 68 Bypass. This will also involve a new crossroad intersection with Kentucky Route 507 on the east side of town. If it comes into fruition, the target date of completion should be before or in the year 2025. The state highway designation for the final extension will be determined upon completion.

Major intersections

The beltway has intersections with KY 91 and KY 272, along with US 41 Alternate. The beltway crosses the following highways/roads more than once:
KY 107 (twice)
Kentucky Route 109 (twice)
U.S. Route 41 (twice)
U.S. Route 68 (twice, including the western and eastern terminus of US 68 Byp., and the western terminus of KY 1682)
Interstate 169 (formerly Pennyrile Parkway) (twice, at exits 6 and 11)

References

External links
US 68 at KentuckyRoads.com

Beltways in the United States
U.S. Highways in Kentucky
U.S. Route 68
Transportation in Christian County, Kentucky